Dhamnagar is a town and a notified area committee in Bhadrak district  in the state of Odisha, India.

Geography

Demographics
 India census, Dhamanagar had a population of 18,555. Males constitute 51% of the population and females 49%. Dhamanagar has an average literacy rate of 52%, lower than the national average of 59.5%: male literacy is 61% and, female literacy is 43%. In Dhamanagar, 15% of the population is under 6 years of age.

Politics
Current MLA from Dhamanagar Assembly Constituency is Bishnu Sethi of BJP, who won the seat in State elections of 2019, defeating Rajendra Kumar Das, of BJD. Previous MLAs from this seat were Muktikanta Mandal and Rajendra Das, both from BJD and  won the seat in 2014 and 2009 respectively, Manmohan Samal who won this seat in 2004 as BJP and BJD coalition candidate, Manas Ranjan Mallick who won in 2000 from the then BJP state president Manmohan Samal.

Manmohan came into controversy in 2006 March 26 by sacrificing an animal in front of Maa Rakshyakali of Rameswarpur. Another controversy made a black spot in his political career is a relationship with a woman. Jagannath Rout who won in 1995 and in 1985 representing INC and in 1980 representing INC(I). Hrudananda Mallik won in 1990 representing JD and in 1977 representing JNP.

Dhamanagar is part of Bhadrak (Lok Sabha constituency).

References

Cities and towns in Bhadrak district